Robert Andrew Hungaski (born December 8, 1987) is an American chess player and coach. He was awarded the FIDE title of Grandmaster (GM) in 2013.

He won a gold medal at the Pan-American Junior Chess Championship in Ecuador in 2007, won the New York International in 2011, the Amsterdam International in 2012, the Argentina Cup in Buenos Aires in 2015 and the Montevideo Blitz Open in 2018.

He qualified to play in the Chess World Cup 2021, where he was defeated 1½-½ by Velimir Ivić in the first round.

In January 2022, he took second place in the Floripa Chess Open, the largest open chess tournament in Brazil.

References

External links
 
 
 
 

1987 births
Living people
American chess players
Chess grandmasters